The Mining industry of Ghana accounts for 5%  of the country's GDP and minerals make up 37% of total exports, of which gold contributes over 90% of the total mineral exports. Thus, the main focus of Ghana's mining and minerals development industry remains focused on gold. Ghana is Africa's largest gold producer, producing 80.5 t in 2008. Ghana is also a major producer of bauxite, manganese and diamonds. Ghana has 20 large-scale mining companies producing gold, diamonds, bauxite and manganese; over 300 registered small scale mining groups; and 90 mine support service companies.

Other mineral commodities produced in the country are natural gas, petroleum, salt, and silver.

Economic impact
Export earnings from minerals averaged 35%, and the sector is one of the largest contributors to Government revenues through the payment of mineral royalties, employee income taxes, and corporate taxes. In 2005, gold production accounted for about 95% of total mining export proceeds.

The extractive mining industry of Ghana is expected to generate an annual revenue of GH₵75.7 billion (US$35 billion) in 2014 and other than industrial minerals and exports from South Ghana such as diamonds, bauxite, and manganese, Ashanti Region also has deposits of barites; basalts; clays; dolomites; feldspars; granites; gravels; gypsums; iron ores; kaolins; laterites; limestones; magnesites; marbles; micas; phosphates; phosphorus; rocks; salts; sands; sandstones; slates; and talcs that are yet to be fully exploited and the Parliament of Ghana has no plans to nationalize Ghana's entire mining industry.

Government policies and programs
Relevant institutions include:
 Ministry of Lands and Natural Resources – overall responsibility for the mining industry
 Minerals Commission – recommends mineral policy; the first contact for prospective investors
 Geological Survey Department – geological studies including map production and maintenance of geological record
 Mines Department – health and safety inspections and maintenance of mining records
 Lands Commission – legal records of licences and legal examination of new applications
 Chamber of Mines – association of representatives of mining companies
 Environmental Protection Agency – overall responsibility for environmental issues related to mining

The Ministry of Lands and Natural Resources(Ghana) oversees all aspects of Ghana's mineral sector and is responsible for granting mining and exploration licenses. Within the Ministry, the Minerals Commission has responsibility for administering the Mining Act, recommending mineral policy, promoting mineral development, advising the government on mineral matters, and serving as a liaison between industry and the government. The Ghana Geological Survey Department conducts geologic studies. The Ghana National Petroleum Corporation (GNPC) is the government entity responsible for petroleum exploration and production. The Precious Minerals Marketing Corporation (PMMC) is the government entity responsible for promoting the development of small-scale gold and diamond mining in Ghana and for purchasing the output of such mining, either directly or through licensed buyers. The Mines Department has authority in mine safety matters. All mine accidents and other safety problems also must be reported to the Ghana Chamber of Mines, which is the private association of operating mining companies. The Chamber also provides information on Ghana's mining laws to the public negotiates with the mine labor unions on behalf of its member companies.

The overall legislative framework for the mining sector in Ghana is provided by the Minerals and Mining Act of 2006 (Act 703). Under the Law, mining companies must pay royalties; companies may also pay corporate taxes at standard rates.

Other legislation that affects mining and mineral exploration in Ghana includes the Minerals Commission Law of 1986 (PNDC Law 154); the Small-Scale Gold Mining Law of 1989; the Investment Promotion Act, 1994 (Act 478); the Additional Profits Tax Law, 1985 (PNDC Law 122); the Minerals (Royalties) Regulations, 1987 (LI 1349); the Environmental Protection Agency Act, 1994 (Act 490); and the Environmental Assessment Regulations, 1999, and as amended, 2002. The Petroleum (Exploration and Production) Law, 1984 (PNDC Law 84), sets out the policy framework and describes the role of the Ministry of Mines and Energy, which regulates the industry. The Ghana National Petroleum Corporation (GNPC), which is empowered to undertake petroleum exploration and production on behalf of the government, is authorized to enter joint ventures and production-sharing agreements with commercial organizations; GNPC was established under the GNPC Law of 1983 (PNDC Law 64). The regulation of artisanal gold mining is set forth in the Small-Scale Gold Mining Law, 1989 (PNDC Law 218). The Precious Minerals Marketing Corporation Law, 1989 (PNDC Law 219), set up the Precious Minerals Marketing Corporation (PMMC) to promote the development of small-scale gold and diamond mining in Ghana and to purchase the output of such mining, either directly or through licensed buyers.

Industry structure
While the bulk of Ghana's mining industry is in legally sanctioned mining by large enterprises, small-scale miners - many operating illegally - extract a large percentage of Ghana's resources.

In the gold sector, Gold Fields Limited of South Africa held a 71.1% interest in the Tarkwa and the Damang gold mines in a joint venture with Toronto-based IAMGOLD Corp. (18.9%), and the Government of Ghana (10%) (U.S. Securities and Exchange Commission, 2005, p. 41). AngloGold Ashanti Ltd. of South Africa operated the Bibiani and the Iduapriem open pit gold mines and the Obuasi underground gold mine. The Bibiani and the Obuasi mines were 100% owned by AngloGold Ashanti and the Iduapriem mine was 80% owned by AngloGold Ashanti and 20% by the International Finance Corporation (AngloGold Ashanti Ltd., 2006a-c). Golden Star Resources Ltd. held a 90% interest in the Bogoso/Prestea and the Wassa open pit mines and a 90% interest in the idled Prestea underground mine. Newmont Mining Corporation of the United States held a 100% interest in the Ahafo gold property and an 85% interest in the Akyem gold property. Companies exploring for gold in Ghana included Adamus Resources Ltd., African Gold plc, Asante Gold Corporation, Moydow Mines International Inc., Pelangio Mines Inc., Perseus Mining Limited, and Xtra Gold Resources

In the bauxite and alumina sector, Alcoa Inc. of the United States held a 10% interest in Volta Aluminum Company Ltd. (Valco); the remaining equity was owned by the Government. Alcan Aluminum Ltd. of Canada held an 80% interest in Ghana Bauxite Company Ltd.; the Government held the remaining 20% interest.

Commodities

Aluminum, bauxite, and alumina
In January 2005, Alcoa signed a memorandum of understanding with the government to develop an integrated aluminum industry in Ghana that would include bauxite mining, alumina refining, aluminum production, and rail transportation infrastructure upgrades. The MOU called for the restart of three of the five existing potlines at the idled Valco smelter, which would produce about 120,000 metric tonnes per year (t/yr) of aluminum; the designed capacity of the plant is 200,000 t/yr. The government and Alcoa planned to restart the Valco smelter as soon as an interim power rate agreement is reached with the Volta River Authority. The government (90%) was to be the managing owner of the smelter and Alcoa (10%), through its subsidiary, Alcoa World Alumina and Chemicals [a joint venture between Alcoa Inc. (60%) and Alcoa Limited of Australia (40%)] was to supply alumina and serve as the distributor of export sales of aluminum. The government had acquired Kaiser Aluminum Corp.’s 90% interest in Valco in 2004. Kaiser closed the Valco plant in 2003 after struggling with fluctuating operating levels for several years and dealing with restricted power allocations from the Volta River Authority.

Canada-based Alcan Inc. and the United States' Alcoa Inc. were the two companies that mined bauxite and alumina. During 2006, Alcoa continued to study the possibility of developing an integrated aluminum industry in Ghana that would include bauxite mining, alumina refining, aluminum production, and rail transportation infrastructure upgrades. Alcan, on the other hand, signed a Memorandum of Understanding with the government for the creation of a joint venture to explore the feasibility of developing a bauxite mine and a 1.5–2.0 million metric tonnes per year (Mt/yr) alumina refinery in Ghana.

Gold
While the bulk of Ghana's gold mining is in legally sanctioned mining by large enterprises, 35% of Ghana's gold is extracted by small-scale miners, most operating illegally.

More than 21% of gold production in the early 1990s came from underground mines in western and Ashanti Region, with the remainder coming from river beds in Ashanti Region and Central Region. During the early 1990s, AGC (Ghana's largest gold producer) saw its overall share of the domestic gold market decline from 80% to 60% as other operators entered the industry.

In 1992 Ghana's gold production surpassed 1 million fine ounces, up from 327,000 fine ounces in 1987. In March 1994, the Ghanaian government announced that it would sell half of its 55% stake in AGC for an estimated US$250 million, which would then be spent on development projects. The authorities also plan to use some of the capital from the stock sale to promote local business and to boost national reserves. The minister of mines and energy dispelled fears that the stock sale would result in foreign ownership of the country's gold mines by saying that the government would have final say in all major stock acquisitions.

In the gold sector, Red Back Mining Inc. of Canada, [through its subsidiary Chirano Gold Mines Ltd. (CGML)] operated the Chirano gold mine; AngloGold Ashanti Ltd. of South Africa operated the Bibiani, the Iduapriem, and the Obuasi gold mines; Golden Star Resources Ltd. of Canada operated the Bogoso/Prestea, the Prestea Underground, and the Wassa gold mines; Gold Fields Ltd. of South Africa operated the Damang gold mine; and Denver-based Newmont Mining Corp. held interest in the Ahafo and the Akyem gold properties.

In October 2005, Red Back Mining. of Canada [through its subsidiary Chirano Gold Mines Limited (CGML)] commissioned a new mine in Ghana. The mine, known as the Chirano gold mine, was an open pit operation located about 21 kilometers (km) to the south of AngloGold Ashanti's Bibiani gold mine in western Ghana. The Chirano gold mine produced 941 kilograms (kg) (reported as 30,247 troy ounces) in 2005 and was 100% owned by Red Back; the government had the option to exercise its right to back into a 10% ownership in CGML. Chirano was scheduled to produce an average of about 3,800 kg (reported as 123,000 troy ounces) per year during a period of 8½ years. The designed capacity of the processing plant was 2.1 million metric tons per year (Mt/yr). A revised resource and reserve estimate for the Chirano Mine was underway in 2005. The economic potential of the Akwaaba deposit, a high-grade deposit within the Chirano mining concession, was being evaluated in 2005, and a resource estimate of the deposit was scheduled for completion in October 2006.

In 2005 gold production at the Bibiani Mine came from the processing of ore from the mine's remaining pits, stockpiled ore, and tailings. Satellite pits were depleted in December 2005, and AngloGold Ashanti expected stockpiled ore to be depleted by January 2006. Beginning in February, the mill was to process only old tailings. The Bibiani Mine, which had operated between 1903 and 1968 as an underground mine, was reopened in 1998 as an open pit mine with a carbon-in-leach (CIL) plant. The mine included old tailings dumps, which were reclaimed in December 2004. These tailings were expected to yield about 3.9 million metric tons (Mt) of ore at an estimated recovery grade of 0.60 gram per metric ton (g/t) gold during a period of 18 months. The company was studying the viability of restarting production from its main pit to a depth of about 60 meters below the current pit floor. Underground exploration was suspended in July 2005 and the underground mine continued to be on care-and-maintenance status. Gold production was expected to decrease to 1 1,700 kg in 2006 from 3,580 kg (reported as 11 115,000 troy ounces) in 2005.

Gold production at the Iduapriem open pit mine increased to 6,380 kg in 2005 (reported as 205,000 troy ounces) from 4,570 kg in 2004 owing to an increase in throughput at the processing plant. AngloGold Ashanti held an 80% interest in the Iduapriem Mine; the remaining 20% was held by the International Finance Corporation. The company also held a 90% interest in the Teberebie Mine, which is adjacent to the Iduapriem Mine; the government held the remaining 10% interest.

In 2005, gold production at the Obuasi underground mine was hindered by a breakdown at the main processing plant during the first quarter of 2005 and the failure of a primary crusher during the third quarter; production, however, increased to 12,200 kg (reported as 391,000 troy ounces) from 7,930 kg in 2004 mostly owing to the start of mining from the Kubi surface oxide deposit. In terms of growth prospects, the company planned to develop the deep-level ore deposits at Obuasi known as the Obuasi Deeps, which were expected to extend the project's mine life to 2040. The development of Obuasi Deeps will require an initial investment of $44 million during the next 4 years to conduct further exploration and feasibility studies. The total capital expenditure for the development of the Obuasi Deeps was estimated to be about $570 million. AngloGold Ashanti held a 100% interest in the Obuasi Mine.

The Wassa open pit gold mine produced 2,149 kg of gold in 2005. The mine, which is located about 150 km west of Accra, was owned by Golden Star (90%) and the government (10%). The mine had been in operation as an open pit heap-leach mine in the 1990s but was closed in 2001. Golden Star acquired the mine in 2002 after determining that conventional CIL processing was economically feasible. Plant feed in 2005 was a mixture of newly mined ore from the Wassa pit blended with material from the heap-leach pads left by the previous operation. Golden Star's planned to increase production at Wassa to about 3,700 kg (reported as 120,000 troy ounces) in 2006 and to produce about 4,000 kg (reported as 130,000 troy ounces) in 2007 as higher-grade ores are reached at deeper levels. As of December 31, 2005, total probable mineral reserves at Wassa were reported to be 21.9 Mt at a grade of 1.34 g/t gold.

In addition to the Wassa Mine, Golden Star operated the Bogoso/Prestea open pit mine, which is located about 300 km west of Accra. Bogoso/Prestea produced 4,103 kg of gold in 2005. Golden Star held a 90% interest in the property, and the government of Ghana held the remaining 10%. About 75% of the remaining ore reserve at Bogoso/Prestea is sulfide. Because this type of ore cannot be processed using the company's existing CIL plant, the company decided in June 2005 to build a new 3.5-Mt/yr processing plant which will use biooxidation to treat the remaining sulfide ore. The new processing plant was scheduled to be completed in late 2006.

The Prestea Underground gold mine, which is also 90% owned by Golden Star, remained idle during the year. Prestea Underground was closed in early 2002 owing to low gold prices. During 2005, a total of 8,096 meters of underground exploration drilling was completed at the mine; drilling was to continue in 2006. Golden Star planned to complete a prefeasibility study by the end of 2006 to evaluate the economic potential of restarting production at Prestea Underground. As of December 31, 2005, inferred mineral resources at the mine were estimated to be 6.1 Mt at an average grade of 8.1 g/t.

In 2005, N Newmont announced the company was advancing the Ahafo and the Akyem gold properties to production. The Ahafo property, which is located about 300 km northwest of Accra between the towns of Kenyase and Ntotoroso, was expected to begin production during the second half of 2006. Production of gold was expected to be about 17,100 kilograms per year (kg/yr) (reported as 550,000 troy ounces), with a mine life estimated to be more than 20 years. The company was awaiting the issuance of a mining license for the development of the Akyem property, which is located in Ghana's eastern region, about 130 km northwest of Accra between the towns of New Abirem and Ntronang. Newmont expected to begin production at Akyem in 2008 and to produce about 15,500 kg/yr of gold (reported as 500,000 troy ounces).

About 19.6 Mt of ore was processed at Tarkwa in 2005 from which 21,051 kg of gold was produced (Gold Fields Limited, 2006§). In November 2005, a new semiautogenous grinding (SAG) mill and CIL plant were commissioned at the Tarkwa Mine. The Tarkwa Mine, which is located in southwestern Ghana about 300 km west of Accra, consists of several open pit operations, one CIL plant, and two heap-leach facilities. Some underground mining had been conducted in the past, but underground operations ended in 1999. As of June 30, 2005, proven and probable reserves at Tarkwa were estimated to be about 417,000 kg of gold (reported as 13.4 million troy ounces) and to last until 2025 at current production rates.

The Damang Mine, which is located in the Wassa West District in southwestern Ghana about 360 km west of Accra and 30 km northeast of Tarkwa Mine, consists of an open pit operation, a SAG mill, and a CIL plant. The mine processed about 5.2 Mt of ore in 2005 and produced about 7,700 kg of gold. Owing to the depletion of the high-grade ore in the main Damang pit, an exploration program to seek for alternative ore sources was launched during the year. The exploration program resulted in the establishment of the Amoanda, the Rex, and the Tomento pits, and the extension of an old pit at Kwesie-Lima. Gold Fields and its partners reported that production from the new pits was to be processed along with stockpiles of lower grade ore. Mining of the Tomento pit began in July 2005 and mining of the Amoanda pit began during the fourth quarter of 2005; production from the Rex pit was scheduled to begin in 2007. As of June 30, 2005, proven and probable reserves at Damang were estimated to be about 40,000 kg of gold (reported as 1.3 million troy ounces) and were projected to last until 2010 at current production rates.

Manganese
Of the 1.6 million metric tons (Mt) of manganese ore produced in 2006, about 52%, or 832,000 t, was shipped to Ukraine; 37%, or 584,000 t, was shipped to China; and the remaining 184,000 t was shipped to Norway. Manganese carbonate ore exported from Ghana has traditionally been used in China as raw material in the production of silicomanganese. Less than 100,000 metric tons per year (t/yr) of this ore material was used to produce electrolytic manganese metal in China, but China's demand for manganese metal was projected to increase to 300,000 t in 2007. China's other supplier of manganese ore was Mexico. Privat Group of Ukraine, which also used manganese ore from Ghana, imported about 832,000 t in 2006. Privat Group acquired the right to manage Ghana Manganese Co. and, as its first order of business, indicated that it intended to amend all existing manganese contracts.

Ghana is one of the world's leading exporters of manganese; however, only 279,000 tons were produced in 1992, compared with the all-time high of 638,000 tons in 1974–75. Ghana has reserves exceeding 60 million tons, and considerable rehabilitation of the sector took place in the 1980s. Ghana National Manganese Corporation's mine and the surrounding infrastructure were repaired, helping to raise production from a low of 159,000 tons in 1983 to 284,000 tons in 1989 and 247,000 tons in 1990. The corporation earned US$20 million from its exports in 1991, up from US$11.6 million in 1989 and US$14.2 million in 1990. Approximately US$85 million was also invested by private investors at the newly explored Kwesikrom deposit. contact Golden Eagle limited the main manganese mining company in 2010,

Diamond
Diamond was recovered by artisanal miners from alluvial and in situ diamond deposits near A Akwatia in the Birim Valley. The only formal commercial production came from a diamond placer mine in Akwatia, which was operated by Government-owned Ghana Consolidated Diamonds Ltd. (GCD).

At least one company, Paramount Mining Corporation Ltd., explored for diamond at two properties in Ghana in 2006. In February 2006, the company entered into a joint-venture agreement with Leo Shield Exploration Ghana Ltd. to earn interest in the Osenase project, which covers an area of 330 square kilometers (km²) located about 25 kilometers (km) south of the Akwatia Diamond Project. Field work began in March 2006. A number of pits were dug in both alluvial and hard rock deposits. The project area also contained gold and columbite-tantalite minerals in the alluvial material. The other property, which was known as Ochinso, covers an area of 37 km² within the Birim Diamond Field of southern Ghana. Paramount, through a farm-in arrangement with Aurion Resources Ltd. of Ghana, would be entitled to acquire 85% of the equity interest in the concession. At least 72 diamonds and 325 small gold grains from 20 small test pits were recovered from the property in 2006. The pits were situated in a number of different river systems throughout the Ochinso project area.

The government also is trying to expand Ghana's diamond-mining industry, which has produced primarily industrial grade gems from alluvial gravels since the 1920s. The main producer is the state-owned Ghana Consolidated Diamonds (GCD), which operates in the Birim River Basin. In the 1960s, the company mined  of diamonds a year, but annual production in 1991 amounted to only . This downturn resulted from technical problems and GCD's weak financial position.

Diamond production was recovered by artisanal miners from alluvial and in situ diamond deposits near Akwatia in the Birim Valley. The only formal commercial production came from a diamond placer mine in Akwatia, which was operated by Government-owned Ghana Consolidated Diamonds Ltd. (GCD).

According to a 2004 report by Partnership Africa Canada and Global Witness Publishing Inc., prior to the creation of the PMMC in 1989, as much as 70% of Ghana's diamond was smuggled out of the country. Following the creation of PMMC, diamond was initially shipped to a PMMC office in Antwerp, Belgium, for sale; currently, an open market has been established in Ghana in which registered buyers can operate from offices within the country and in which licensed diamond traders are allowed to operate. All buyers (exclusively Ghanaian nationals) must transfer U.S. dollars through the Central Bank in advance for the purchase of diamond. Only about 200 of the 1,000 registered buyers were thought to be active during 2004. Purchased diamond was kept under lock in the custody of the PMMC and subject to inspection before being exported. According to the report, Ghana was fully implementing the Kimberley Process but the country lacked the resources to monitor and control illicit diamond mining and buying, especially from the artisanal mining areas. In Akwatia, for example, an informal diamond market existed where no paperwork was required to buy or sell diamond; this market was known locally as the "Belgian market". The report also indicated the possibility of diamond being smuggled from Côte d'Ivoire, especially following the sanctions on diamond exports imposed on this country in 2004 (Partnership Africa Canada and Global Witness Publishing Inc., 2004, p. 3–5).

It was reported that while annual diamond production from GCD continued to decline, diamond production from artisanal miners was increasing and that there was a possibility for the privatization of GCD. Foreign companies (not identified) were said to be interested in the Akwatia alluvial diamond field in the upper Birim River catchment area.

Cement
The Building and Road Institute of the Council for Scientific and Industrial Research of Ghana was conducting laboratory tests to evaluate the possibility of producing pozzolana cement from bauxite mining waste (known as red mud or clay). The two companies that produced cement in Ghana, Ghana Cement Works Ltd. and Diamond Cement Ghana Limited used imported clinker, gypsum, and limestone for the manufacturing of cement. About 2 Mt of clinker was imported in 2003 for the production of Portland cement.

Petroleum
Petroleum exploration activities have been conducted in Ghana since the late nineteenth century; and commercially sustainable deposits of petroleum or natural gas was discovered in 2008 by Kosmos. The total crude oil found is estimated to be about 6.5 million barrels. Production started in early 2010 in the Jubilee Field and as at 21 April 2011, Kosmos alone has lifted 1.9 million barrels from the Jubilee Field. The Saltpond oilfield, which produced a total of 294,430 barrels when it reopened in 2002 to its closing in 2004. Gas flared at Saltpond averaged 2 million cubic feet per day. The Tema Oil Refinery refined all the crude petroleum imported into the country, with the exception of consignments going to the Takoradi thermal powerplant.

At least two companies were exploring for petroleum in the country in 2006. These included Dallas-based Kosmos Energy LLC, which was conducting exploration offshore at West Cape Three Points Block, and Vanco Energy Co. of the United States, which explored for petroleum at the Cape Three Points Deepwater Block (CTPD) in the Tano-Ivorian Basin.

Dallas-based Kosmos Energy LLC held an 86.5% working interest in the West Cape Three Points (WCTP) Block in the Gulf of Guinea’s Tano Basin. In 2005, the company conducted a 1,075-km2 three-dimensional (3-D) survey to evaluate the potential of the block. The WCTP Block is located about 8 km from the Ghanaian coastline and 95 km southwest of the city of Takoradi. The remaining interest in WCTP was held by GNPC (10%) and E.O. Group of Ghana (3.5%).

Final environmental impact assessment permits were granted in Benin, Ghana, and Togo for the West African Gas Pipeline (WAGP) between March and April 2005. The West Gas Pipeline Company Limited (WAGPCo) was granted a license to construct the pipeline in April, and the first shipload of about 8,000 pipes was delivered to the Tema Port in May. In September, Chevron Corporation, the WAGP project manager, announced that WAGPCo had begun the installation of the 569 km main offshore segment of the pipeline. The WAGP was expected to be operational by December 2006 and to deliver gas to powerplants and industries in Benin, Ghana, Nigeria, and Togo.

Vanco Energy Company explored for petroleum at the Cape Three Points Deepwater Block (CTPD), which is located in the Tano-Ivorian Basin. The company had signed an exploration agreement with the Government in 2002 at which time it conducted a two-dimensional (2-D) seismic program to evaluate the block. In 2005, the company carried out a 1,500-km2 3-D seismic program to further define the structural and stratigraphic prospects in the block. The first well in the CTPD Block was planned for 2007.

Environmental impact

The Ghanaian Environmental Protection Agency (EPA) was the Government entity responsible for the formulation of policies on all aspects of the environment. The agency's functions included acting in liaison and cooperating with other Government agencies; collaborating with foreign and international agencies, as necessary; conducting investigations into environmental issues; coordinating the activities of bodies concerned with the technical aspects of the environment for the purpose of controlling the generation, treatment, storage, transportation, and disposal of industrial waste; ensuring compliance with environmental impact assessment procedures; issuing environmental permits and pollution abatement notices; making recommendations to the Government for the protection of the environment; prescribing standards and guidelines related to the pollution of air, water, and land; protecting and improving the quality of the environment; and securing the control and prevention of discharge waste into the environment among several other functions.

In 2005, the Center for Public Interest Law and the Center for Environmental Law, two Accra-based nongovernmental organizations, sued Bonte Gold Mines Ltd. (an 85% owned subsidiary of Akrokeri-Ashanti Gold Mines Inc. of Canada), Ghana's Minerals Commission, and the EPA for the reclamation of the environment after the cessation of Bonte's gold mining operations along the Jeni River. Bonte closed its operations at Bonteso in the Ashanti region in March 2004, citing problems concerning low-grade ore, equipment unavailability, and a default of its financial obligations during 2003. The company allegedly did not follow the due process for mine decommissioning, such as by failing to post bonds to the EPA for the reclamation of lands, failing to notify workers of its intention to liquidate, not paying up-to-date wages to workers, and leaving a debt of about $18 million owed to various state institutions and private companies. The EPA and the Minerals Commission were accused of failing to ensure Bonte's compliance to operate in a sustainable manner.

Ghana's Obuasi region is known to host arsenopyritic goldbearing ore bodies. According to company reports, during the 1990s, an arsenic precipitation plant was installed at the Pompora Treatment Plant for the commercial recovery of arsenic from the roaster flue gases. At the time, the recovered arsenic trioxide was sold to Europe for commercial applications. As the market for arsenic declined, the treatment plant was shut down in 2000 and about 10,000 metric tons (t) of arsenic was stockpiled in bags at Obuasi. After the introduction of the Biox treatment process, the arsenic trioxide was converted to arsenic pentoxide and deposited in tailings dams. AngloGold Ashanti Ltd. (the company that was formed through the merger of Ashanti Goldfields Ltd. and AngloGold Ltd.) reported that inadequate storage of the stockpiled bags allegedly caused arsenic contamination to the Pompora stream. The problem was identified during the company's due diligence study prior to the merger. AngloGold Ashanti constructed a lined storage dam at the old heap leach site. The company planned to move the arsenic to a new facility where it will be stored and gradually disposed of by blending it into the Biox process circuit where it will be chemically stabilized and deposited as a component of the tailings residue in the new Sansu Tailings Storage Facility. The company estimates that it will take about 6 years to dispose of the arsenic.

Illegal mining has had an extensive impact on Ghana's environment. 60% of Ghana's water bodies are polluted by illegal artisanal gold mining, as well as industrial waste, household disposals and farming.

History
Ghana has produced and exported gold for centuries. In precolonial times, present-day Ghana was one source of the gold that reached Europe via trans-Saharan trade routes. In the fifteenth century, Portuguese sailors tried to locate and to control gold mining from the coast but soon turned to more easily obtained slaves for the Atlantic slave trade. Most gold mining before the mid-nineteenth century was alluvial, wherein miners recovered gold from streams. Modern gold mining that plumbs the rich ore deposits below the Earth's surface began about 1860, when a Fante man of mixed-race by name Thomas Hughes, imported heavy machinery to begin mining in the western areas of present-day Ghana. His machinery was however sabotaged and could not start. Actual mining began  in the late 1870s to early 1880s. The richest deposit, the Obuasi mine, was discovered by two Fante men by name Joseph Ellis and Joseph Biney who were later joined by another Fante man Joseph Brown. They sold the rights to the deposit cheaply to E A Cade because of British government's duplicitous behaviour.  E.A. Cade, the founder of Ashanti Goldfields Corporation (AGC). Since the beginning of the twentieth century, modern mining in the Gold Coast has been pursued as a large-scale venture, necessitating significant capital investment from European investors.

Under British colonial rule, the government controlled gold mining to protect the profits of European companies. The colonial government also restricted possession of gold as well as of mercury, essential in recovering gold from the ore in which it is embedded. Following independence, foreign control of the sector was tempered by increasing government involvement under the Nkrumah regime; however, production began to decline in the late 1960s and did not recover for almost twenty years. In the mid-1960s, many mines began to hit poorer gold reefs. Despite the floating of the international gold price in the late 1960s, few investors were willing to invest, and the government failed to provide the capital necessary to expand production into new reefs. Of the two major gold mining enterprises, neither the State Gold Mining Corporation nor AGC (40% controlled by the government) expanded or even maintained production.

Under the ERP, the mining sector was targeted as a potential source of foreign exchange, and since 1984, the government has successfully encouraged the rejuvenation of gold mining. To offer incentives to the mining industry, the Minerals and Mining Law was passed in 1986. Among its provisions were generous capital allowances and reduced income taxes. The corporate tax rate was set at 45%, and mining companies could write off 75% of capital investment against taxes in the first year and 50% of the remainder thereafter. The government permitted companies to use offshore bank accounts for service of loans, dividend payments, and expatriate staff remuneration.

Ghana's mineral sector had started to recover by the early 1990s after its severe decline throughout the 1970s. One indicator of the scale of decline was that by 1987, only four gold mines were operating in Ghana, compared with eighty in 1938. Throughout the 1970s, the output of gold, as well as bauxite, manganese, and diamonds, fell steadily. Foreign exchange shortages inhibited mine maintenance, new exploration, and development investment. The overvalued cedi and spiraling inflation exacerbated mining companies' problems, as did smuggling and the deteriorating infrastructure. Energy supplies failed to meet the industry's growing needs; foreign exchange shortages constrained oil imports, and domestically generated hydroelectricity was unable to make up the shortfall.

After 1983, however, the government implemented a series of measures to enhance the sector's appeal. In 1986 new mining legislation for the gold and diamond sectors replaced the previous complex and obsolete regulations, and a generous incentives system was established that allowed for external foreign exchange retention accounts, capital allowances, and a flexible royalties payment system. Since then the sector has benefited from a wave of fresh investment totaling US$540 million since 1986, and by the early 1990s mining was the country's second highest foreign exchange earner.

Under legislation passed after 1983, the government liberalized and regularized the mining industry. For the first time, the government made small claim-holding feasible, with the result that individual miners sold increasing amounts of gold and diamonds to the state-operated Precious Minerals Marketing Company. In 1990 the company bought  of diamonds and 20,000 ounces of gold and earned a total of US$20.4 million through sales, 70% of it from diamond sales and 30% from gold bought from smallscale operators. Furthermore, the government succeeded in attracting significant foreign investment into the sector and, by early 1991, had signed over sixty mining licenses granting prospecting rights to international companies. To forestall domestic criticism of large-scale foreign control of the sector, the government announced in mid-1991 the establishment of a state-controlled holding company to buy shares in mines on behalf of private, that is, foreign, investors.

In the early 1990s, the government announced plans to privatize its diamond-mining operations and to expand production. At Accra's invitation, De Beers of South Africa agreed to undertake an eighteen-month feasibility study to determine the extent of the Birim River Basin diamond reserves. The survey was to cost US$1 million. A De Beers subsidiary will be the operator and manager of GCD, while Lazare Kaplan International, a New York-based diamond polishing and trading company, will produce and market the diamonds.

In 1989 the government established the Precious Minerals Marketing Corporation (PMMC) to purchase minerals from small producers in an effort to stem diamond smuggling. Estimates suggested that as much as 70% of Ghana's diamonds were being smuggled out of the country in the mid-1980s. In its first sixteen months of operation, the PMMC bought  of diamonds and 20,365 ounces of gold and sold  of diamonds worth US$8 million. The corporation also earned ¢130 million in 1991 on its jewelry operations, up 48% from the previous year, and it planned to establish joint marketing ventures with foreign firms to boost sales abroad. Nevertheless, because of new complaints over raw gem sales, the government in March 1992 ordered an investigation into the operations of the state agency and suspended its managing director.

Accidents
In April 2013, at least 17 people were killed while mining illegally at a disused gold mine in Ghana's central region. The ground reportedly caved in on the miners as they searched for gold deposits, and authorities were unclear as to how many miners originally went in. Sixteen bodies were excavated, with one man dying in hospital from his injuries.

See also
 Geology of Ghana
 Economy of Ghana

References

External links
 Mining Journal special publication – Ghana, March 2010

Industry in Ghana
Mining in Ghana
Ghana